Thomas Bahnson Stanley (July 16, 1890 – July 10, 1970) was an American politician, furniture manufacturer and Holstein cattle breeder.  A Democrat and member of the Byrd Organization, Stanley served in a number of different political offices in Virginia, including as the 47th speaker of the Virginia House of Delegates and as the Commonwealth's 57th governor. He became known for his support of the Massive Resistance strategy to prevent school desegregation mandated by the United States Supreme Court's decisions in Brown v. Board of Education, and Virginia's attempt to circumvent those decisions (ultimately overturned by both the Virginia Supreme Court and by federal courts) was known as the Stanley Plan.

Early life

He was born to Crockett Stanley (January 8, 1838 – March 12, 1915) and Susan Matilda Walker (August 17, 1845 – April 9, 1922) on a farm near Spencer, Henry County, Virginia, the youngest of seven children. He married Anne Pocahontas Bassett (November 28, 1898 – October 20, 1979) on October 24, 1918 in Bassett, Virginia. Anne was the daughter of John David Bassett (July 14, 1866 – February 26, 1965), a founder of Bassett Furniture, and Nancy Pocahontas Hundley (November 21, 1862 – January 11, 1953). Stanley graduated from Eastman Business College in Poughkeepsie, New York in 1912.

Business

Stanley worked for his father-in-law's company, Bassett Furniture, as an executive until 1924, when he left and founded Stanley Furniture, a leading Virginia furniture maker,  in what would become Stanleytown, Virginia. His sons Thomas Bahnson Stanley, Jr. and John David Stanley joined him at Stanley Furniture.

Politics

As the Great Depression began, Henry County voters elected Stanley to represent them (part time) in the Virginia House of Delegates. Re-elected multiple times, he served from 1930 to 1946, and fellow delegates elected him their speaker from 1942 to 1946. After the end of World War II, voters elected Stanley to the U.S. House of Representatives, where he represented Virginia's 5th district from November 5, 1946 until February 3, 1953 when Stanley resigned on to run for Virginia's governor. Fellow Byrd Organization loyalist and former Virginia Governor William M. Tuck succeeded to the seat.

The Byrd Organization selected Stanley to be the Democratic candidate for governor of Virginia in 1953, and he won the Democratic primary. In the general election, Stanley handily defeated Republican Theodore Roosevelt Dalton and Independent Howard Carwile. He served as the Governor of Virginia from 1954 to 1958. As governor, Stanley improved the administration of state hospitals and increased funding to mental hospitals and public schools.

While governor, Stanley became embroiled in conflict. The budget fight between the Old Guard of the Byrd Organization and the Young Turks (many returning military veterans) over budget surpluses and historic underfunding of education (especially egregious with respect to non-white Virginians) in the 1954 legislative session affected relations in the state's Democratic Party for a generation. Stanley supported segregation, and the United States Supreme Court declared such illegal twice in Brown v. Board of Education (which included a companion case from Prince Edward County, Virginia). After the 1954 Brown decision, Governor Stanley appointed a committee of mainly politicians from Southside Virginia (historically over-represented in the Virginia General Assembly and which depended politically on various methods of disenfranchising non-white Virginians) to study ways to preserve segregation through legislative means, including a school voucher program. Meanwhile, U.S. Senator Harry F. Byrd declared the strategy known as Massive Resistance, while Richmond News Leader publisher James J. Kilpatrick advocated a more drastic policy, which passed a special legislative session in 1956 and became known as the Stanley Plan. Most parts were declared illegal by Virginia and federal courts within three years, long after Governor Stanley's term had ended. In fact, although Governor Stanley had vowed to close schools to prevent their desegregation, that aspect of the plan was first tested under the next Governor, J. Lindsay Almond after a federal panel ordered desegregation of Charlottesville schools in 1958.

Electoral history
1946; Stanley was elected to the U.S. House of Representatives and concurrently won a general election to the seat with 75.4% and 73.52% respectively in both races, defeating Republican William Creasy in both races.
1948; Stanley was re-elected with 99.53% of the vote, defeating Independent Gene Graybeal.
1950; Stanley was re-elected unopposed.
1952; Stanley was re-elected unopposed.
1953; Stanley was elected Governor of Virginia with 54.76% of the vote, defeating Republican Theodore R. Dalton and Independent Howard Hearness Carwile.

Later years
After his gubernatorial term ended, Stanley resumed his oversight of the furniture business, as well as became vice president and director of the First National Bank, and chairman of the Commission on State and Local Revenues and Expenditures. However, the Byrd Organization imploded in the 1960s, after U.S. Supreme Court decisions upholding the one-man, one-vote principle, including Davis v. Mann.

Death

Stanley died in Martinsville, Virginia on July 10, 1970 and is buried in Roselawn Burial Park.  His home Stoneleigh was listed on the National Register of Historic Places in 1982.

References

External links
Stanley Furniture
Congressional Biography
Biography at Encyclopedia Virginia

|-

|-

|-

1890 births
1970 deaths
20th-century American businesspeople
20th-century American politicians
Methodists from Virginia
Democratic Party members of the United States House of Representatives from Virginia
Democratic Party governors of Virginia
Eastman Business College alumni
People from Henry County, Virginia
Speakers of the Virginia House of Delegates